Menachem Daum is an Orthodox Jewish documentary film-maker.  Born in displaced persons camp in Germany, to refugees from Poland who had survived the Holocaust.  Being Jewish, many of his relatives perished in Nazi Germany's genocide.  Professionally a gerontologist, he is based today in Borough Park, Brooklyn, New York.

He has created two documentary films, A Life Apart (1997) on Hasidim in Brooklyn, and Hiding and Seeking, (2003) a film on Polish gentiles that sheltered Jews during World War II. Through his efforts, he secured the Yad Vashem award for the family that sheltered his wife's family. He partnered on the films with Oren Rudavsky.  As of 2008, he was working on a film, Common Ground, which will address the work of non-Jews in working to maintain Jewish cemeteries in Poland.

His 2004 film, Hiding and Seeking, began as a search to reconnect with the Poles that sheltered his family.  The Jewish Week wrote of Daum's work on this film, "The film speaks more deeply to how religious intolerance is insidious no matter who is practicing it, and upbraids Holocaust survivors who broke all ties with their rescuers, despite wartime promises to stay in touch forever.

"'I believe in the importance of self-criticism for all communities, Jewish, non-Jewish Islamic, Christian,' says Daum. 'We do ourselves a disservice when we can see faults in others but not see our own shortcomings.'"

Notes

External links
page at Internet Movie Database
Professional portrait in The Jewish Week

Living people
American Orthodox Jews
American documentary filmmakers
Year of birth missing (living people)
People from Borough Park, Brooklyn